Leek is a civil parish in the district of Staffordshire Moorlands, Staffordshire, England. It contains 143 listed buildings that are recorded in the National Heritage List for England. Of these, one is listed at Grade I, the highest of the three grades, five are at Grade II*, the middle grade, and the others are at Grade II, the lowest grade.  The parish contains the town of Leek and the surrounding area.  An ancient market town, it became industrial in the late 18th century mainly with the weaving, spinning and dyeing of silk.  During the 19th century many of the more notable buildings were designed by the architects William Sugden and his son William Larner Sugden.  Many of the listed buildings in the town are centred around St Edward's Church, in Church Street, St Edward Street, and Market Place.

Most of the listed buildings in the town are houses and associated structures, offices, public houses and hotels, shops, mills, and public buildings, and outside the town they are farmhouses and farm buildings.  The oldest listed buildings are ancient crosses in the churchyard and Market Place, the ruins of Dieu-la-Cres Abbey, and St Edward's Church itself.  The Leek Arm of the Caldon Canal runs through the parish, and the listed buildings associated with it are a bridge, an aqueduct, and a tunnel entrance.  Included among the other listed buildings are a plague stone, items in St Edward's churchyard, almshouses, other churches, bridges, a railway signal box, mileposts, a milestone and a series of boundary stones, a drinking fountain, public conveniences, cemetery chapels and gates, a bank, war memorials, and a telephone kiosk.



Key

Buildings

References

Citations

Sources

Lists of listed buildings in Staffordshire